Stefan Schostok (born 12 May 1964) is a German politician of the Social Democratic Party and was Mayor of Hanover from 11 October 2013 until 26 May 2019. From 2008 to January 2013 he served as a member of the Lower Saxony Legislative Assembly. During that time, he was elected chairman of the SPD group in the Lower Saxony Legislative Assembly (Landtag) in 2010, a position which he vacated in 2013.

Education and Employment 
Schostok has lived in Hanover since 1971, having been a longtime resident of Isernhagen. In 1985 he obtained the Fachhochschulreife in the Kaiser-Wilhelm-Gymnasium Hannover, and in the following two years, Schostok underwent his alternative civilian service in Isernhagen. Subsequently, he studied social pedagogy and in 1991 graduated as a trained social educator. 

From 1991 to 1995, Schostok was employed at the Bildungsnetzwerk Niedersächsischer Volkshochschulen. Later, in 1995 and 1996, he worked as a scientific employee at the political magazine SPW. From 1996 to 1999, he was a research assistant at the Foundation for Labour and Environment of the IG BCE trade union. Then, in 1999, whilst at the Niedersächsisches Ministerium für Umwelt, Energie und Klimaschutz (Lower Saxony Ministry for the Environment, Energy and Climate Protection), he conducted public relations work on behalf of the ministry. In 2000, Stefan Schostok was elected chairman of the SPD district Hanover, one of the largest and most influential regions within the Social Democrats in Lower Saxony, and he served in this position until October 2009.

Political career 

Schostok has been a member of the SPD since 1983. From 1995 he was a member of the executive of the SPD district Hanover. In the years from 1991 to 1995 he was chairman of the Juso district Hanover. On October 31 2009 he was elected as the chairman of the SPD district Hanover. From 2001 to 2005 he was a council member of the municipal council Isernhagen, in which he served on the economy, environment and finance committees. 

From 2008 to 2013 Schostok was a member of the Landtag in Lower Saxony. Also, Schostok was leader of the integration work group. From June 14 2010 to January 22 2013, he served as chairman of his party's parliamentary group in the Landtag. Towards the end of 2011, he decided not to seek reelection to the State Parliament and instead announced his candidacy for the office of Mayor of Hanover, in order to succeed incumbent Stephan Weil. 

In April 2012, Schostok became the Social Democrat nominee for Mayor, obtaining the support of 96 percent of the delegates of Hanover's Social Democrats. In the first round of the mayoral election, on September 22 2013, he missed the required absolute majority with 48.9 percent of the votes against the Christian Democratic candidate Matthias Waldraff, who had 33.8 percent of the votes. The second round saw Schostok win by a landslide, winning with 66.3% of the votes. He was the third Mayor of Hannover to be elected directly by the citizens.

Schostok also served as deputy chairman of the SPD in Lower Saxony, under the leadership of its chairman Stephan Weil.

In April 2019, the public prosecutor's office of Hannover announced an inquiry against Schostok regarding breach of trust in public office. It claimed that he knew about illegal payments in advantage of two high ranking public officials within his municipality. Oppositional parties in the delegation demanded his resignation, which he initially refused. On April 30th 2019, he announced consequences from allegations made by the prosecutor's office.

Other activities

Corporate boards
 Deutsche Messe AG, Ex-Officio Member of the Supervisory Board (2013-2019)
 Sparkasse Hannover, Ex-Officio Member of the Supervisory Board (2013-2019)

Non-profit organizations
 Evangelische Akademie Loccum (Evangelical Academy Loccum), Member of the Council  
 Deutsch-Türkische Gesellschaft (German-Turkish Society), Member 
 IG Bergbau, Chemie, Energie (IG BCE), Member

Personal life 
Schostok is a bachelor and lives in the Hanover-List district.

Bibliography 
 Publications of the institute for social history Braunschweig.

References 

1964 births
Living people
Social Democratic Party of Germany politicians
Mayors of Hanover
People from Hildesheim